Estadio Juan Maldonado Gamarra is a multi-use stadium in Cutervo Province, Peru. It is used mostly for football matches and is the home stadium of Comerciantes Unidos of the Liga 2 Peru and Club Deportivo Los Inseparables of the Copa Perú. The stadium holds 8,000 spectators. 

Juan Maldonado Gamarra
Buildings and structures in Cajamarca Region
Comerciantes Unidos